Hugh Stoker (1920–December 2006) was a British-born angler and author who wrote classic texts
on the subjects of angling and walking in the Dorset area. His writing career spanned some 40 years; his first book The Seaside Pocket companion was published in 1956 and his last book Wildtrack walks in West Dorset in 1996.

He had lived eastern edge of the caravan park Seatown in Dorset.

References

1920 births
2006 deaths
English travel writers
English sportswriters